Kim Sung-joon or Kim Seong-jun may refer to:

 Kim Sung-joon (sport shooter, born 1968), South Korean Olympic sport shooter
 Kim Sung-joon (sport shooter, born 1973), South Korean Olympic sport shooter
 Kim Sung-joon (footballer), South Korean footballer